Aumont-en-Halatte (literally Aumont in Halatte) is a commune in the Oise department in northern France.

Population

See also
Communes of the Oise department

References

Communes of Oise